Cédric Marszewski, also known as Pilooski, is a French DJ. After touring numerous places (mainly France and Europe) and producing in diverse styles of music ranging from drum and bass (Vendome.rec) to hip hop (Groove vibration). Pilooski has recorded as both an independent artist and with several record Labels. He is best known for remixes of songs from the 1950s, 1960s and 1970s.

Career
Cédric Marszewski started music as a sound designer for the French national radio, Radio France. As a musician and producer he later joined, Guillaume Sorge and Clovis Goux in The D*I*R*T*Y collective (both were formerly working as journalists for French TV Canal+ amongst other things). Together they released music compilation (the Dirty edits series) and The Dirty Space Disco for French label Tigersushi and released the hit "Beggin" remix that was used in many worldwide television advertisements.

He created theme music for an Adidas advertisement, remixing the Frankie Valli song "Beggin'". Another campaign used his remix of Dee Edwards' "Why Can't There Be Love?", the remix of the song and the song itself have gained widespread popularity ever since, as well as the "Celebrating Originality on the Streets" campaign.

After the international release of his remix of "Why Can't There Be Love?", Pilooski's originality caught the attention of the online-downloads based audience, giving him the opportunity to encounter more publicity contracts, as well as keeping a stable position to be considered for further Adidas collaborations.

Pilooski has been working for fashion as music supervisor for brands such as Hermès (since 2010), Christophe Lemaire, Lanvin (alongside Guillaume Sorge), Bonpoint. He works as a music supervisor or composer for Hermès perfume campaign, on various projects featuring Jarvis Cocker, Narumi (Tristesse Contemporaine), Mark Kerr, Baxter Dury, French writer Simon Liberati, as well as composing the score for upcoming French-Lebanese director Joyce A. Nawashati’s first full-length movie Blind Sun.

As a producer, Pilooski produced Tristesse Contemporaine, Hypnolove, Perez, Discodeine (one of his side-project), he worked with Jarvis Cocker (Pulp), Baxter Dury, Matias Aguayo and Kevin Parker (Tame Impala).

Style
Pilooski's style has been noted for its atypical standards, and his outstanding beat and remarkable usage of diverse musical influences is reflected in both his original work and remixes or covers, in which he is able to preserve the spirit and sentiment of the original creations while impregnating his personal label upon the songs.

Discography

References

French DJs
Living people
Year of birth missing (living people)